Colossus is the first EP by Australian progressive rock band Caligula’s Horse. It was released independently  in September 2011 to showcase their recently expanded lineup after the positive online response for their debut album Moments from Ephemeral City, which was originally intended to be a one-off project between vocalist Jim Grey and guitarist Sam Vallen.

Track listing
Lyrics and music by Vallen and Grey.

Personnel
Caligula’s Horse
 Jim Grey – vocals
 Sam Vallen – guitar
 Zac Greensill – guitar
 Dave Couper – bass
 Geoff Irish – drums
Production
 Sam Vallen – producer, mixing, mastering, engineering

References

2011 EPs
Caligula's Horse (band) albums
Albums produced by Sam Vallen
Self-released EPs